Following is a complete list of American Volunteer Group (Flying Tigers) pilots. The AVG was operational from December 20, 1941, to July 14, 1942. The press continued to apply the Flying Tigers name to later units, but pilots of those organizations are not included.

In most air forces, a victory is defined as the destruction of an enemy aircraft in air-to-air combat, and those shown below are the "confirmed" claims as recorded in AVG records, unearthed by aviation historian Frank Olynyk. The Chinese government paid the pilots a bonus of $500 for each enemy aircraft destroyed, whether in the air or on the ground.

Aces while Flying Tigers are in bold.

See also
Robert Lee Scott, Jr., who was allowed by Claire Chennault to fly some missions with the Tigers

References

External links
"Flying Tigers In Burma", March 30, 1942 Life magazine article, including photographs of pilots
Roster of the Flying Tigers, 1941-1942, annotated rosters of pilots, ground crew, and attached personnel

American World War II pilots
Flying Tigers
Lists of aviators
Lists of military personnel